The .22 Spitfire (Originally the Johnson MMJ 5.7mm Spitfire, also known as 5.7mm Johnson or 5.7mm MMJ) is an American wildcat rifle cartridge developed by Melvin Johnson.

In 1963, firearms designer Melvin Johnson developed a conversion of the M1 Carbine to the Johnson MMJ 5.7mm Spitfire Cartridge, The cartridge is based on the .30 Carbine cartridge, necked-down to .224 (5.7 mm) caliber.  Originally designed with a 1-in-14 twist barrel, the 40 grain .22 Hornet bullet was the standard load. It could also be loaded with lighter or heavier weight bullets available at that time for the .22 Hornet as well as most bullet weights up to 50 grains such as that used by the .222 Remington (5.7×43mm).

The conversion is essentially a .22  caliber  (5mm) barrel fitted to an M1 Carbine receiver with an appropriate feed ramp for the caliber brazed or welded into the receiver. Some commercial production M1 Carbines were originally manufactured in this caliber with the feed ramp for the .22 Spitfire integral to the barrel.

The specifications tend to land the cartridge about halfway between the 5.56×45mm NATO and the more recent 5.7x28mm FN. Ballistically it is very similar to the rimmed .22 Hornet, but fashioned in a rimless cartridge design appropriate for a self-loading carbine with very light recoil. The Spitfire M1 Carbine originally was advertised as firing a 40-grain (2.6g) bullet with a muzzle velocity of 3050 ft/s (930 m/s), though handloaders with careful selection of modern powders and appropriate bullets consistently safely exceed those numbers while remaining within the M1 Carbine's Maximum Pressure rating of 38,500 psi (265 MPa). In comparison, the "standard" load for the .30 Carbine has a .30 Carbine ball bullet weighing 110 grains (7.1 g); a complete loaded round weighs 195 grains (12.6 g) and has a muzzle velocity of 1,990 ft/s (610 m/s), giving it 967 ft⋅lbf (1,311 joules) of energy when fired from the M1 carbine's 18-inch barrel.

Johnson advertised the smaller caliber and the modified carbine as a survival rifle for use in jungles or other remote areas. It was light, and easily carried ammunition in a light, fast handling carbine with low recoil.

See also
.22 TCM
5.7×28mm
.224 Boz
.221 Remington Fireball, a similar necked .22 centerfire round
List of cartridges by caliber
List of rifle cartridges
5 mm caliber

Notes

References
 Barnes, Frank C., ed. by John T. Amber. "MMJ-5.7mm", in Cartridges of the World, pp. 127 & 143. Northfield, IL: DBI Books, 1972. .

Pistol and rifle cartridges
Paramilitary cartridges
Wildcat cartridges